Warrawee railway station is located on the North Shore line, serving the Sydney suburb of Warrawee. It is served by Sydney Trains T1 North Shore line services.

History
Warrawee station opened on 1 August 1900. A new footbridge was installed in 1977, which had a steel roof added in 1995 for weather protection. In 2009, the platforms were repaired and resurfaced.

In August 2020 the station was upgraded and a lift was installed.

Platforms and services

Transport links
Warrawee station is served by one NightRide route:
N90: Hornsby station to Town Hall station

References

External links

Warrawee station details Transport for New South Wales

Easy Access railway stations in Sydney
Railway stations in Sydney
Railway stations in Australia opened in 1900
North Shore railway line
Ku-ring-gai Council